Everything and More is the first album by Christian rock band StorySide:B.

Track listing
"Everything And More"
"It's Not Over"
"Miracle"
"More to This Life"
"Hold Me Down"
"You're Not Alone"
"Breathe"
"Send Me a Sign"
"Dance to Me"
"In Your Eyes"
"Off the Ground"

References

External links 
StorySide:B
Gotee Records

Gotee Records albums
StorySide:B albums
2005 debut albums